Juan Ignacio Cirac Sasturain (born 11 October 1965), known professionally as Ignacio Cirac, is a Spanish physicist. He is one of the pioneers of the field of quantum computing and quantum information theory. He is the recipient of the 2006 Prince of Asturias Award in technical and scientific research.

Career 
Cirac graduated from the Complutense University of Madrid in 1988 and moved to the United States in 1991 to work as a postdoctoral scientist with Peter Zoller in the Joint Institute for Laboratory Astrophysics in University of Colorado at Boulder. Between 1991 and 1996, he was teaching physics in the Ciudad Real Faculty of Chemistry, University of Castilla-La Mancha.

In 1996, Cirac became professor in the Institut für Theoretische Physik in Innsbruck, Austria, and in 2001 he became a director of the Max Planck Institute of Quantum Optics in Garching, Germany, where he heads the Theory Division. At the same time, he was appointed honorary professor at the Technical University of Munich. He is a distinguished visiting professor and research advisor at ICFO – the Institute of Photonic Sciences in Barcelona since its foundation in 2002. He has been a member of research teams at the universities of Harvard, Technical University of Munich, Hamburg, UCSB, Hannover, Bristol, Paris, CEA/Saclay, École Normale Supérieure, Massachusetts Institute of Technology.

His research is focused on quantum optics, the quantum theory of information and quantum many-body physics. According to his theories, quantum computing will revolutionize the information society and lead to much more efficient and secure communication of information. His joint work with Peter Zoller on ion trap quantum computation opened up the possibility of experimental quantum computation, and his joint work on optical lattices jumpstarted the field of quantum simulation. He has also made seminal contributions in the fields of quantum information theory, degenerated quantum gases, quantum optics, and renormalization group methods. As of 2017 Juan Ignacio Cirac has published more than 440 articles in the most prestigious journals and is one of the most cited authors in his fields of research. He has been named among others as a possible candidate to win the nobel prize in physics.

Other activities

Corporate boards 
 Telefónica, member of the board of directors (since 2016)

Non-profit organizations 
 Fundación La Caixa, member of the advisory council (since 2015)
 Annalen der Physik, member of the advisory board (since 2012)
 Fundación BBVA, member of the scientific committee (since 2010)

Honors and awards 
Ignacio Cirac has been granted multiple awards, notable ones being the 2006 Prince of Asturias Award, the BBVA Foundation Frontiers of Knowledge Award in the Basic Sciences category ex aequo with Peter Zoller, and The Franklin Institute's 2010 Benjamin Franklin Medal in Physics (jointly with David J. Wineland and Peter Zoller). He was awarded the Wolf Prize in Physics with Peter Zoller in 2013. In 2018 he received the Max Planck Medal of the German Physical Society and the Micius Quantum Prize.

He was elected a Fellow of the American Physical Society in 2003. In 2017 he became a member of the German Academy of Sciences Leopoldina.

See also 
Cirac–Zoller controlled-NOT gate

References

External links 

BBVA Foundation Frontiers of Knowledge Awards

Lectures and panels
Video of panel discussion, "Harnessing Quantum Physics" with Ignacio Cirac, Michele Mosca, Avi Wigderson, Daniel Gottesman, Peter Shor and Dorit Aharonov, at the Quantum to Cosmos festival
 

1965 births
Living people
People from Manresa
Complutense University of Madrid alumni
Quantum physicists
Optical physicists
Academic staff of the Technical University of Munich
Wolf Prize in Physics laureates
Winners of the Max Planck Medal
Recipients of Princess of Asturias Awards
20th-century Spanish physicists
21st-century Spanish physicists
Quantum information scientists
Directors of Telefónica
Fellows of the American Physical Society
Members of the German Academy of Sciences Leopoldina
Max Planck Institute directors